Padaminchi (Padamingi) is a village located in Tiruppathur Taluk in Sivaganga District,  Tamil Nadu, India.

The nearest town is Ponnamaravathi, located 8.5 kilometers away. The nearest railway station is Manapparai, located 50.5 kilometers away.

Indian Postal service is provided by the Ulagampatti post office. Pin code: 630410 .

References
Padaminchi Village

Villages in Sivaganga district